The 2001 Canadian census was a detailed enumeration of the Canadian population.  Census day was May 15, 2001.  On that day, Statistics Canada attempted to count every person in Canada.  The total population count of Canada was 30,007,094.  This was a 4% increase over 1996 census of 28,846,761.  In contrast, the official Statistics Canada population estimate for 2001 was 31,021,300.  This is considered a more accurate population number than the actual count.

The previous census was the 1996 census and the following census was in 2006 census.

Canada by the numbers

A summary of information about Canada.

Census summary 

Canada has experienced one of the smallest census-to-census growth rates in its population. From 1996 to 2001, the nation's population increased only 4.0%. The census counted 30,007,094 people on May 15, 2001, compared with 28,846,761 on May 14, 1996.

Only three provinces and one territory had growth rates above the national average. Alberta's population soared 10.3%, Ontario gained 6.1% and British Columbia, 4.9%. Nunavut's population rose 8.1%. The population of Newfoundland and Labrador declined for the second consecutive census period.

Urbanization continued. In 2001, 79.4% of Canadians lived in an urban centre of 10,000 people or more, compared with 78.5% in 1996. Outside the urban centres, the population of rural and small-town areas declined 0.4%.

In 2001, just over 64% of the nation's population, or about 19,297,000 people, lived in the 27 census metropolitan areas (CMAs), up slightly from 63% in 1996. Seven of these 27 CMAs saw their populations grow at a rate of at least double the national average. The strongest rise, by far, occurred in Calgary.

From 1996 to 2001, the nation's population concentrated further in four broad urban regions: the extended Golden Horseshoe in southern Ontario; Montreal and environs; British Columbia's Lower Mainland and southern Vancouver Island; and the Calgary-Edmonton corridor. In 2001, 51% of Canada's population lived in these regions, compared with 49% in 1996.

Population by province/territory

Demographics

Mother tongue

Population by mother tongue of Canada's official languages:

Aboriginal peoples
Population of Aboriginal peoples in Canada:

Ethnic origin

Population by ethnic origin. Only those origins with more than 250,000 respondents are included here.  This is based entirely on self reporting.

Religion

Population by religion. Only those religions with more than 250,000 respondents are included here.  The census question was partly aided—that is, the questionnaire form gave examples of some of the denominations but not others.  The actual question asked is noted below.  

The actual question asked:  "What is this person's religion?  Indicate a specific denomination or religion even if this person is not currently a practising member of that group.For example, Roman Catholic, Ukrainian Catholic, United Church, Anglican, Lutheran, Baptist, Coptic Orthodox, Greek Orthodox, Jewish, Islam, Buddhist, Hindu, Sikh, etc."''

Visible minorities

Age

Population by age:

Methodology

Every person was legally required to return the census questionnaire that required answering basic demographic information.  In addition randomly selected people were legally required to complete a much more detailed questionnaire.

On May 15, 2001, Statistics Canada had thousands of canvassers who went around to try to ensure that the entire population was counted.  For the first time, this included canvassers who went to homeless shelters to ensure that the homeless were included in the census.

In addition to a small number of individuals who refused to participate, some first nation communities refused to participate en masse and therefore some of the statistics are inaccurate.  This is noted as footnotes in many of the affected results.

Effects of the census

The census numbers are the basis of the federal governments transfer payments to the provinces and therefore when a province loses population, its transfer payments are decreased.

In addition, the census numbers are one of the elements that Elections Canada uses to create the boundaries of federal ridings.

See also

 Population of Canada
 Demographics of Canada
 Ethnic groups in Canada
 History of immigration to Canada

References

External links
 2001 Census - Statistics Canada's page on the 2001 census.

Census
Censuses in Canada
2001 censuses